This is a list of the Maryland state historical markers in Worcester County.

This is intended to be a complete list of the official state historical markers placed in Worcester County, Maryland by the Maryland Historical Trust (MHT). The locations of the historical markers, as well as the latitude and longitude coordinates as provided by the MHT's database, are included below. There are currently 10 historical markers located in Worcester County.

References 

Worcester County